John Dove Harris (1809 – 20 November 1878) was an English Liberal politician who sat in the House of Commons between 1857 and 1874.

Harris was the son of Richard Harris former MP for Leicester and his wife Fanny Dove, daughter of William Dove of Moulton, Northamptonshire. He was Mayor of Leicester in 1850 and in 1856. He was a Deputy Lieutenant and J.P. for Leicestershire, and a J.P. for Leicester.

In 1857 Harris was elected Member of Parliament for Leicester but lost the seat in 1859. He stood unsuccessfully in 1861 but was re-elected as MP for Leicester at the 1865 general election. He held the seat until 1874.

Harris died at the age of 69.

Harris married Emma Shirley, daughter of George Shirley of Tamworth in 1831.

References

External links

1809 births
1878 deaths
Liberal Party (UK) MPs for English constituencies
UK MPs 1868–1874
UK MPs 1857–1859
UK MPs 1865–1868
Mayors of places in Leicestershire
Deputy Lieutenants of Leicestershire